Bassano del Grappa ( or Bassan) is a city and comune, in the Vicenza province, in the region of Veneto, in northern Italy. It bounds the communes of Cassola, Marostica, Solagna, Pove del Grappa, Romano d'Ezzelino, Campolongo sul Brenta, Conco, Rosà, Cartigliano and Nove. Some neighbourhoods of these communes have become in practice a part of the urban area of Bassano, so that the population of the whole conurbation totals around 70,000 people.

The 16th century painter Jacopo Bassano was born, worked, and died in Bassano, and took the town name as his own surname.

History

Prehistoric and Roman periods

The city was founded in the 2nd century BC by a Roman called Bassianus, whence the name, as an agricultural estate. However, an ancient bronze sword (called "spada di Riccardo"), found in 2009
and dating back to the 7th century BC, possibly between the 18th and 15th century BC, suggests that the area of Bassano was already inhabited not just in the pre-Roman period, but possibly even in the pre-Venetic period, as confirmed by some artifacts found in a necropolis located in the neighbourhood of San Giorgio di Angarano.

From the Middle Ages to Venice

The first news of the existence of the medieval city dates from 998, while the castle is mentioned first in 1150. In 1175 Bassano was conquered by Vicenza, but the city maintained a semi-autonomous status as a free comune in the 13th century also, when it was home to the family of the Ezzelini, who first unified the various territories of Veneto.

In 1278, according to Giovanni da Nono, Matteo of the Cortusi family of Padua was elected podestà. In 1281, the city came under Paduan control. In 1368 Bassano was acquired by the Visconti of Milan and was given the status of "separate land" (terra separata).

In 1404, Bassano became a part of the Stato da Tera 'Mainland State' of the Venetian Republic, which granted the Bassanese district the status of autonomous podesteria, "free and separate from whatever city and from the jurisdiction of whatever city" (sit ipsa terra exempta et separata a quacumque civitate et iurisdictione cuiuscumque civitatis) and subordinate only to Venice. The autonomous district included Bassano properly and the villas of Cartigliano, Cismon and Primolano, Rossano, San Nazario, Pove, Solagna plus Cassola (on lands previously belonging to Pove and Solagna) and Tezze and Rosà (on lands previously part of Bassano). In addition to this, Valstagna and Campese (then belonging to Vicenza and the Seven Communes) and Romano and Mussolente (then belonging to Treviso) had strong commercial and political ties with the district as they were located very close to Bassano and its port on the river Brenta connected with Venice. In 1760 Doge Francesco Loredan granted Bassano the title of City, subsequently retained under the Austrian and the Italian States. The Serenissima did not alter the town's magistratures, limiting itself to impose a Captain chosen by the Venetian Senate. The city became home to a flourishing industry producing wool, silk, iron and copper, and mainly for ceramics; in the 18th became especially famous in all Europe for the presence of the  printer company.

From the fall of Venice to modern times

During the French Revolutionary Wars the city was the site of the Battle of Bassano. In 1815 it was included in the Kingdom of Lombardy–Venetia, and became part of the unified Kingdom of Italy in 1866. Napoleon Bonaparte remained in Bassano del Grappa for many months.

The original name of the town was Bassano Veneto. After the terrible battles on Mount Grappa in World War I, where thousands of soldiers died, a decision was made to change the name of the town.  In 1928, the name was changed to Bassano del Grappa, meaning Bassano of Mount Grappa, as a memorial to the soldiers killed.
Ernest Hemingway during his days as an ambulance driver in the war spent many days in Bassano and eventually settled there as part of A Farewell to Arms. Also other American writers spent some days in Bassano during World War I such as Scott Fitzgerald and Dos Passos.

During World War I Bassano was in the front area, and all industrial activities were halted.

In the last days of World War II, Bassano del Grappa was bombed by USAF B-24s and B-17s.

The symbol of the town is the covered Ponte Vecchio, which was designed by the architect Andrea Palladio in 1569. The wooden pontoon bridge was destroyed many times, the last time during World War II.  The Alpine soldiers, or Alpini have always revered the wooden bridge and Bassano del Grappa.  After the destruction of the bridge, they took up a private collection and had the bridge completely rebuilt.  Often soldiers flock to the bridge to remember and sing songs from their days as alpine soldiers. The grappa shop of Nardini Distillery is located on the bridge, known as Ponte degli Alpini.

Bassano del Grappa is also the long residence town of Renzo Rosso, the founder and President of Diesel. Since Diesel began to expand in the mid-1980s, the company has become an important source of business for the city and its surrounding region. As thanks for the support that Rosso has received locally, he has invested personally in the city's professional soccer team, Bassano Virtus 55 S.T.

Geography
The city lies at the foothills of the Venetian Prealps, where river Brenta comes out the southern end of Canal di Brenta (also called Valbrenta 'Brenta valley') and flows in the lowlands at the borders of Vicenza, Treviso and Padua provinces.

Main sights

The cathedral (Duomo), built around the year 1000 but renovated in 1417. It has works by Leandro da Bassano, Ottavio Marinali and others
The Castello Superiore (Upper Castle)
The church of St. John the Baptist, built in the 14th century and restored in the 18th century.
San Francesco: with a Crucifix by Guariento (14th century) and remains of contemporary frescoes. Next to the church is the Town Museum, with ancient archaeological remains, works by Antonio Canova and the Tiepolos, and drawings by Gian Lorenzo Bernini, Spagnoletto, Albrecht Dürer and Rembrandt
The wooden covered Bridge, or Ponte degli Alpini, on the Brenta River, designed in 1569 by the architect Andrea Palladio to replace a pre-existing construction existing at least from 1209. The bridge was destroyed in 1748, and was rebuilt three years later. The Nardini tavern on the bridge is unchanged since 1779.
Palazzo Michieli-Bonato, with a façade frescoed by Jacopo da Bassano.
The Palazzo del Municipio (Town Hall), erected from 1404. It has a noteworthy loggia and a fresco attributed to Jacopo da Bassano.
The Monte di Pietà, a Renaissance edifice with 15th-century coats of arms.
The Palazzo Sturm, home to the Ceramics Museum
The Torre Civica (Civic Tower, 14th Century) 43 metres, in Piazza Garibaldi.

In the neighbourhood are the Villa Rezzonico, designed by Baldassarre Longhena, Art Nouveau's Villa Agnesina, designed by Francesco Bonfanti in 1923,  and the 17th century Villa Bianchi-Michiel, with a garden decorated by statues.

Administrative subdivisions 
The municipal statute (art.6, par.2) of Bassano, recognizes only Rubbio as frazione and defines Campese, Marchesane, San Michele, Sant'Eusebio and Valrovina as contrade. The other existing neighbourhoods of Bassano are not mentioned in the statute. However, in practice, all the administrative subdivisions have the same prerogatives and are named quartieri.

Frazioni 
This hamlet is contiguous with another hamlet, also named Rubbio, which is part of the commune of Conco. Thus, in practice, the two hamlets form one village (named Rubbio), even though they belong to two different communes from the administrative point of view.

Contrade 
Officially, the contrade (in ven. contrae) are Campese, Marchesane, San Michele, Sant'Eusebio and Valrovina. From an administrative point of view these are also quartieri. However, in practice, some of these neighbourhoods themselves contain smaller inhabited areas (as streets, groups of houses) also called contrade: there are thus contrade within contrade. Besides, some places known as contrade exist also within other neighbourhoods which are officially simply defined as quartieri, but not contrade.

Quartieri 
All the administrative subdivision (quartieri) of Bassano are: Centro Storico, Margnan-Conca d'oro, San Marco, San Vito, Ca'Baroncello, Quartiere Firenze, Nuovo Ospedale, San Lazzaro, San Fortunato, Borgo Zucco, Marchesane, Rondò Brenta, Angarano, Quartiere XXV Aprile, Sant'Eusebio, San Michele, Valrovina, Rubbio, Campese, Merlo, Quartiere Pré, Santa Croce.

Rubbio, with an area of 6.835 km2, is the largest quartiere of Bassano, but also the least populated (86 inhabitants in 2009).

Quartiere Prè (an old venetian plural meaning meadows, the modern ven. plural is prai), located in the southern lowland of Bassano, is the second least populated quartiere (299 inhabitants in 2009). Part of it hosts an industrial zone that also falls in the nearby San Lazzaro, but it also contains a considerable rural area which falls within the Parco rurale sovracomunale Civiltà delle Rogge regional park.

San Vito, in the north-eastern part of Bassano, is the most inhabited quartiere (5841 inhabitants in year 2009). It merges with the built-up areas of the bordering comunes Romano d'Ezzelino, San Giuseppe di Cassola and Pove del Grappa.

Territorial variations 
Until 1928, the official name of Bassano del Grappa was simply Bassano (as it is still informally called today).
In 1878, the neighbourhood of Campese, previously belonging to the commune of Campolongo sul Brenta is detached from Campolongo and aggregated to Bassano. In 1938, the commune of Valrovina, which also comprised Rubbio, is suppressed and aggregated to Bassano.

Notable people 
 

 Luigi Agnolin, football referee
 Jacopo Bassano, painter
 Jeronimo Bassano, Master of Trumpets and Shawms to the Doge in Venice 
 Giovanni Battista Brocchi, geologist
 Giusto Bellavitis, (1803 -1880), mathematician and senator 
 Miki Biasion, World Rally Champion
 Luisa Vania Campagnolo (born 1968), luthier
 Simone Cogo (Sir Bob Cornelius Rifo), Musician and founder of The Bloody Beetroots
 Luigi Fabris, sculptor and ceramist, founder of Manifattura Italiana Porcellane Artistiche Fabris 
  Pietro Fabris, senator
 Tommaso Gabrielli, Motorcycle racer
 Antonio Gaidon, (1738 -1829), architect, civil engineer, naturalist (Antonio Gaidon)
 Tito Gobbi, opera singer
 Federico Marchetti, footballer
 Francesca Michielin, singer and songwriter
 Jacek Pałkiewicz, Polish journalist, traveler and explorer. Fellow (by recommendation from Thor Heyerdahl) of the prestigious London-based Royal Geographical Society and numerous other such societies, he is best known for his discovery of the sources of the Amazon River.
 Joseph Pivato, writer and academic in Canada, born in Tezze sul Brenta.
 Stefano Rusconi, professional basketball player, who also played in the NBA
 Renzo Rosso, Founder and President of Diesel (brand) and the Only The Brave Group
 Iacopo Vittorelli, poet
 Giovanni Volpato, engraver

International relations

Twin towns – Sister cities
Bassano del Grappa is twinned with:

Main industries in the Bassano del Grappa area
Diesel (brand)
Baxi
Manfrotto
Vimar
ABB
Montegrappa

References

External links

Official website
Personal webpages about the network of tributaries and ditches connected to Brenta in Bassano

Cities and towns in Veneto
Domini di Terraferma
Populated places established in the 2nd century BC